Millville is an unincorporated community in Green Township, Mahoning County, in the U.S. state of Ohio.

References

Unincorporated communities in Mahoning County, Ohio
Unincorporated communities in Ohio